The 1925 Tulane Green Wave football team represented the Tulane Green Wave of Tulane University in the sport of American football during the 1925 Southern Conference football season.

Tulane shut out  6 of its 10 opponents, with its only blemish a tie to Missouri Valley champion Missouri. For the second year in a row, Tulane set a school record for wins in a season. Most notable was the defeat of Northwestern, a game which helped herald the arrival of Southern football. The team was ranked No. 6 in the nation in the Dickinson System ratings released in January 1926.

Peggy Flournoy was the nation's leading scorer with 128 points.

Before the season
Coach Shaughnessy never had such a wealth of material as 1925.  The backfield included captain and Hall of Fame quarterback Lester Lautenschlaeger and halfback Peggy Flournoy.  Though he was famous for later using the T formation, at Tulane coach Shaughnessy employed the single wing. Assistant Bierman left for the Mississippi A&M job.

1925 saw the south's widespread use of the forward pass.

Schedule

Season summary

Louisiana College

The season opened on a wet, sloppy field. Tulane beat Louisiana College of Pineville 77–0. Coach Shaughnessy only allowed his regulars to play half of the game. Lester Lautenschlaeger was probably the star of the game.

Missouri

The only blemish on the year was a 6–6 tie to Missouri. Missouri scored on a 30-yard pass. Peggy Flournoy plunged over for the tying touchdown.

The starting lineup was Gamble (left end), Wight (left tackle), Levy (left guard), H. Wilson (center), Blackledge (right guard), Talbot (right tackle), Brown (right end), Lautenschlaeger (quarterback), Morgan (left halfback), Flournoy (right halfback), Norman (fullback).

Ole Miss

The Green Wave used the forward pass to beat coach Homer Hazel's Ole Miss Rebels 26–7.

The starting lineup was Gamble (left end), Wight (left tackle), Levy (left guard), H. Wilson (center), Blackledge (right guard), Talbot (right tackle), G. Wilson (right end), Lautenschlaeger (quarterback), Morgan (left halfback), Flournoy (right halfback), Lamprecht (fullback).

Mississippi A&M

Former assistant Bernie Bierman's Mississippi Aggies took the lead 3–0 in the opening quarter with a drop kick. Harry P. Gamble blocked a couple of kicks and Tulane came back to win 25–3. After the defeat of the Aggies, some Tulane supporters felt the Wave would defeat Alabama.

The starting lineup was Gamble (left end), Wight (left tackle), Levy (left guard), H. Wilson (center), Blackledge (right guard), P. Brown (right tackle), D. Wilson (right end), Lautenschlaeger (quarterback), Flournoy (left halfback), Morgan (right halfback), Lamprecht (fullback).

Northwestern

In the 18–7 triumph over Northwestern, Flournoy scored three touchdowns and skied his punts. Northwestern's score came in the second period.

The starting lineup was Gamble (left end), Wight (left tackle), Levy (left guard), H. Wilson (center), Blackledge (right guard),  Talbot (right tackle),  Wilson (right end), Lautenschlaeger (quarterback), Flournoy (left halfback), Morgan (right halfback), Lamprecht (fullback).

Auburn

On a field thick with muddy, Alabama clay in Montgomery, the Green Wave won over the Auburn Tigers 13–0, scoring all points in the second half.

Louisiana Tech
Flournoy scored 31 of Tulane's 37 points in the win over Louisiana Polytechnic despite Tulane using mostly reserves.

The starting lineup was Gamble (left end), Browne (left tackle), Levy (left guard), H. Wilson (center), Blackledge (right guard), Wight (right tackle), D. Wilson (right end), Lautenschlaeger (quarterback), Menville (left halfback), Flournoy (right halfback), Lamprecht (fullback).

Sewanee

Tulane defeated the Sewanee Tigers 14–0. All scores took place in the third quarter. A 32-yard pass from Lautenschlaeger to Brown set up the first score. On the second, Flournoy got loose for a 68-yard run off tackle.

LSU

After a scoreless first half, Tulane beat the rival LSU Tigers by a 16–0 score. A pass from Lautenschlaeger to Menville got the first touchdown. The final points were scored by Irish Levy dropping the LSU quarterback for a safety.

Centenary
Something of an anticlimax after the LSU game, Tulane beat Centenary 14–0 to cap an undefeated season.

Postseason
Tulane shared the SoCon title with Wallace Wade's Alabama Crimson Tide, which went on to win the Rose Bowl.  Tulane's administration declined a Rose Bowl invitation, in order to keep their student-athletes in class. 

One account reads "In the South they call "Peggy" Flournoy of Tulane University, the greatest all-round gridder in that section." Flournoy led the nation in scoring in scoring with 128 points, and was awarded the Most Valuable Player (MVP) award by the Veteran Athletic's Association. He was selected by Billy Evans and Norman E. Brown as a first-team halfback on their 1925 College Football All-America Teams. He was also named a second-team All-American by the Associated Press and the All-America Board. Flournoy and Irish Levy were All-Southern. Levy was never taken out of a game for an injury during his playing career. Lautenschlaeger made Billy Evans' Southern Honor Roll.

Flournoy's school record of 128 points was not broken until 2007 by Matt Forte.

Personnel

Depth chart
The following chart provides a visual depiction of Tulane's lineup during the 1925 season with games started at the position reflected in parenthesis. The chart mimics a single wing on offense.

Line

Backfield

Unlisted

References

Bibliography
 
 

Tulane
Tulane Green Wave football seasons
Southern Conference football champion seasons
College football undefeated seasons
Tulane Green Wave football